William de Oliveira Saldanha (born 7 February 1989), the Saldanha born in the Porto Alegre, is a defender who plays for EC São José. He can also play as midfielder.

References

External links
 ogol
 soccerway

1989 births
Living people
Brazilian footballers
Campeonato Brasileiro Série A players
Campeonato Brasileiro Série B players
Campeonato Brasileiro Série C players
Campeonato Brasileiro Série D players
Grêmio Barueri Futebol players
Avaí FC players
Marília Atlético Clube players
Ypiranga Futebol Clube players
Botafogo Futebol Clube (PB) players
Treze Futebol Clube players
Futebol Clube Santa Cruz players
Esporte Clube São José players
Esporte Clube Novo Hamburgo players
Esporte Clube Cruzeiro players
Clube Esportivo Lajeadense players
Esporte Clube Passo Fundo players
Association football fullbacks
Footballers from Porto Alegre